Sledgers Icefall is a heavily crevassed icefall midway up the Sledgers Glacier in the Bowers Mountains; its location is just north of the tip of Reilly Ridge. Named by the New Zealand Geological Survey Antarctic Expedition (NZGSAE), 1967–68, in conjunction with Sledgers Glacier and as a locality worth distinguishing in connection with the use of sledges.

Icefalls of Antarctica
Glaciers of Pennell Coast